Daniel Stephen Lodboa (September 25, 1946 – May 11, 2019) was a Canadian professional ice hockey player who played 58 games in the World Hockey Association.  Born in Thorold, Ontario, he played with the Chicago Cougars.

Lodboa was a tri-captain of the 1969-1970 Cornell Men's Ice Hockey Team, the only team in NCAA history to complete a season with a perfect record, going 29-0. He was the first defenseman to ever become the top Cornell scorer for a season, with 61 points on 24 goals and 37 assists in 1970.  Over this three-year varsity career he accounted for 134 points (52-82).  He was named The Cornell Daily Sun Athlete of the Year for 1969-70. Lodboa's career highlight is scoring a natural hat trick in the third period of the championship game in 1970, winning the tournament MOP in the process. Lodboa died on May 11, 2019 at the age of 72.

Awards and honors

References

External links

 Loadboa's entry in the Cornell Athletics Hall of Fame

1946 births
Canadian ice hockey left wingers
Chicago Cougars players
Cornell Big Red men's ice hockey players
Dallas Black Hawks players
Ice hockey people from Ontario
2019 deaths
Long Island Cougars players
Suncoast Suns (SHL) players
NCAA men's ice hockey national champions
AHCA Division I men's ice hockey All-Americans